DiRado is a surname. Notable people with the surname include:

Maya DiRado (born 1993), American swimmer
Stephen DiRado (born 1957), American photographer